Sanae Nakahara (Japanese: 中原早苗; July 31, 1935 – May 15, 2012) was a Japanese actress from Tokyo. She starred in over 80 films and television shows, the most prominent being her role in the films Lady Snowblood (1973), Yagyu Clan Conspiracy (1978), and Day of Resurrection (1980). Her husband was famed Japanese film director Kinji Fukasaku, and her son, Kenta Fukasaku, is another well-known Japanese film director.

Early life and education 
She graduated from the Kunimoto Girls' High School. Her mother was a stage actress and raised her after divorcing her father.

Career 
She first starred in the film Mura Hachibu while still in high school, a film about the Shizuoka Prefecture Ueno village ostracism incident. Two years later she signed an exclusive contract with Japanese movie studio Nikkatsu, appearing in films such as Season of the Sun. She appeared in around 80 works over the next 8 years before becoming independent and acting for other studios.

Her most recent work had mainly been appearances on stage.

Personal life
Nakahara married Kinji Fukasaku, who at the time was a young director at Toei. They had no meetings and he gave her no acting guidance, but after the film he took, as she described, a furious approach with letters and phone calls. They decided to get married after being together only 3 months. Whenever he directed his own starring actresses, the media was taken with stories of the crisis of their marriage. She continued to support her husband’s filmmaking.

Death 
Nakahara died in her home on May 15, 2012. An apartment manager, at the request of her son, entered her home and found her collapsed in the bathroom. Doctors confirmed her death at the hospital with the cause of death being heart failure.

Filmography

Actress 

 Kani Kōsen (1953) .... Natsu
 Mura hatibu (1953)
 Moeru Shanghai (1954) .... Qing Lian
 Wakai hitotachi (1954)
 Aisureba koso (1955) .... Minako (segment 3)
 Ôkami (1955)
 Hi no tori (1956)
 Niko-yon monogatari (1956) .... Kimiko
 The Baby Carriage (1956) .... Sachiko Kaneda
 Gyûnyû ya Furankî (1956) .... Hatsu
 Frankie Bûchan no Aa gunkanki (1957)
 All We Want Is Happiness (1957) .... Kimiko
 Frankie Bûchan no zoku aa gunkaki: Nyogo ga-shima funsenki (1957)
 Temptation (1957) .... Mitsuko Sakuragi
 Kokoro to nikutai no tabi (1958) .... Ruriko Tachibana
 Chi to ai no shuppatsu (1958) .... Yôko Tsugawa
 Red Quay (1958)
 Endless Desire (1958) .... Ryuko
 Kurenai no Tsubasa (1958) 
  Shiki no aiyoku (1958)
 Arashi no naka o tsuppashire (1958)
 Talented Woman (1959)
 Kawaii onna (1959) .... Yûko Ejima
 Nangoku Tosa o ato ni shite (1959) .... Asako Nakamura
 The Wandering Guitarist (1959) .... Sumiko Shôji
 Umi no wanâ (1959)
 Hatoba no muho mono (1959)
 Kizû darakê no ôkite (1960)
 Ajisai no uta (1960) .... Noriko Shimamura
 Wataridori itsu mata kaeru (1960)
 Smashing the 0-line (1960)
 Tokyo Mighty Guy (1960) .... Rirako
 Kenka Tarô (1960) .... Hideko Iwashita
 Umi no joji ni kakero (1960) .... Ranko Maki
 Ashita hareru ka (1960) .... Setsuko Kajiwara
 Ore wa dawâ sare naî (1960)
 Pigs and Battleships (1961) .... Hiromi
 Rokudenashi yarô (1961) .... Natsue Inoue
 Umi no shôbushi (1961) .... Kyôko
 Aitsu to watashi (1961) .... Asako Nomizo
 Dôdôtaru jinsei (1961) .... Hiroko
 Yajû no mon (1961) .... Yukari Saijô
 Sûkettô kagyô (1961)
 Aniki (1962)
 The Lucky General (1962)
 Omizu hara (1962)
 Namarî o buchi komê (1962)
 Mekishiko mushuku (1962) .... Teru Akazawa
 Gân wa sâmushô otoko no utasâ (1962)
 Kanto Wanderer (1963) .... Yamada Hanako
 Warrior of the Wind (1964) .... Oyumi
 Ankokugai Main Street (1964) .... Sanae Sanjo
 Zoku zûzûshii yatsu (1964) .... Maria
 Ôkami to buta to ningen (1964)
 Kunoichi ninpō (1964) .... Oyui
 Sleepy Eyes of Death: Sword of Fire (1965) .... Oryô
 Himo (1965) .... Akiko Kubo
 The Ghost of the One Eyed Man (1965) .... Michiko Onda
 Tange Sazen (1965, TV Series) .... Ofuji
 Kuroi yuwaku (1965)
 Jigoku no hatobâ (1965)
 Nihon Kyokaku-den: Ketto Kanda-matsuri (1966) .... Hatsue
 Odoshi (1966) .... Mother of the baby
 By a Man's Face Shall You Know Him (1966)
 Judo Showdown (1966) .... Tone
 Shojo jutai (1966) .... Keiko Miyaoka
 Zoku Tokyo nagaremono- Umi wa makka na koi no iro (1966)
 Mesu ga osu o kuikorosu: Kamakiri (1976) .... Yukie Soda
 Haru ranman (TV Series) (1967)
 Maboroshi kurozukin-yami ni tobu kage (1967)
 Women's Prison (1968) .... Prostitute's sister
 The House of the Sleeping Virgins (1968)
 Inochi karetemo (1968)
 Women's Cell (1968) .... Okma
 Kamisama no koibito (1968)
 Yoru No Kayo: Inochi Karetomo (1968)
 Shinjuku no hada (1968) .... Mineko
 I, the Executioner (1968)
 Secrets of a Woman's Temple (1969) .... Kyôen
 Nemuri Kyoshiro engetsu sappo (1969)
 Japan Organized Crime Boss (1969) .... Ooba's wife
 Dorifutazu desu yo! Tokkun tokkun mata tokkun (1969)
 Play It Cool (1970) .... Madame
 Kigeki: otoko ârimasû (1970)
 If You Were Young: Rage (1970)
 Under the Flag of the Rising Sun (1972) .... Mrs. Ochi
 Horror Theater Unbalance (TV Series) (1973) .... Morgue no satsujinsha
 Female Prisoner Scorpion: 701's Grudge Song (1973) .... Akiko Inagaki
 Lady Snowblood (1973) .... Kitahama, Okono
 Battles Without Honor and Humanity: Police Tactics (1974)
 Battles Without Honor and Humanity: Final Episode (1974)
 New Battles Without Honor and Humanity (1974)
 Police Tactics (1974) .... Kikue
 Aka chochin (1974)
 Cops vs. Thugs (1975)
 New Battles Without Honor and Humanity: The Boss's Head (1975)
 Aoi sei (1975) 
 Oni no uta (1975)
 Shinsha no naka no onna (TV Series) (1976)
 Jitsuroku gaiden: Osaka dengeki sakusen (1976) .... Chie
 New Battles Without Honor and Humanity: Last Days of the Boss (1976) .... Hisano
 Hokuriku Proxy War (1977)
 Shogun's Samurai (1978) .... Lady Kusaga (Iemitsu's Aid)
 The Fall of Ako Castle (1978) .... Todano tsubone
 Nomugi Pass (1979)
 virus (1980) .... Young Mother-Tokyo
 Furueru shita (1980) .... Sadae
 Asshii-tachi no machi (1981) .... Michiko
 The Challenge (TV Series) (1982) .... Cashier (as Sanae Nakahara)
 Ikiru (TV Series) (1983)
 Fureai (TV Series) (1986)
 Shinran: Path to Purity (1987) .... Woman at waiting
 Poruno joyû sayako no bôken (TV Movie) (1987)
 Nonchan no yume (TV Series) (1988) 
 Pachinko monogatari (1990)
 Tanba Tetsuro no daireikai shindara odoroita!! (1990) .... Doctor of human community 
 Onna nezumi kozô: Nerawareta Karakurijô shijô saiaku no dai hâdo (TV Movie) (1995)
 Kaze no rondo (TV Series) (1995)
 Manbiki G-Men Nikaidô Yuki 3 (TV Movie) (1999) .... Kuniko motohashi
 Manbiki G-Men Nikaidô Yuki 4 (TV Movie) (1999) .... Kuniko motohashi
 Manbiki G-Men Nikaidô Yuki 5 (TV Movie) (2000) .... Kuniko motohashi
 Lily Festival (2001) .... Teruko Satoyama

References 

1935 births
2012 deaths
Actresses from Tokyo
21st-century Japanese actresses
Japanese television actresses
Japanese film actresses
20th-century Japanese actresses